The Central Academy of Drama, abbreviated Zhong Xi, is a drama school in Beijing, China. It is a Chinese state Double First Class University Plan university identified by the Ministry of Education of China. The school is the first theatre higher educational institution of the People's Republic of China. It is ranked as the best top-level drama, film, and television arts institution in China and has been selected into the country's Double First Class University Plan. The Central Academy of Drama is a central subordinate university and is also an art college directly under the Ministry of Education. It is the highest institution of education in dramatic art among the world's leading art institutions in Chinese drama, visual arts teaching and research center. The Central Academy of Drama is also the headquarters of the World Theatre Education Alliance (WTEA), China Alliance of Theatre Higher Educational Institutes and Asia Theatre Education Centre (ATEC). The Central Academy of Drama has engaged in the practice of drama and the visual arts for more than 50 years and is a bastion of experimental theater drama in China. The school also holds the UNESCO Chair on Theatre Education.

Location
The academy is located at 39 E Mianhua Hutong, Dongcheng Qu, Beijing Shi, 100009.

History
The academy was established in April 1950 with Ouyang Yuqian as its first president and was named by Mao Zedong. It inherited the drama department of Lu Xun Art Academy in Yan'an, the art school of North China University and the National Drama College in Nanjing.  Many famous actors, actresses and directors have graduated from the Academy including Zhang Ziyi, Jiang Wen, Gong Li and Li Landi.

Rankings and reputation 
The Central Academy of Drama is regarded as the most prestigious drama school in China and ranked 2nd in Asia and 32nd in the world by the 2021 QS World University Rankings in Performing Arts.

Notable alumni 

Note that class year indicates the entrance year, not graduating year.

 Acting Department
Class of 1950: Jin Yaqin
Class of 1954: Zheng Zhenyao
Class of 1959: Yan Shunkai
Class of 1960: Wen Xingyu
Class of 1974: Chen Baoguo, Guo Lianwen
Class of 1979: Chen Daoming
Class of 1980: Jiang Wen, Lü Liping, Yue Hong
Class of 1982: Ni Dahong
Class of 1984: Zhang Hanyu, Wu Xiubo
Class of 1985: Gong Li, Jia Hongsheng, Wei Zi, Chen Wei
Class of 1986: Chen Zhihui
Class of 1987: Hu Jun, Xu Fan
Class of 1988: Guo Tao, Wu Xiubo
Class of 1989: Tao Hong
Class of 1990: Li Yapeng, Chen Jianbin
Class of 1991: Huang Zhizhong
Class of 1993: Zhu Yuanyuan, Wang Qianyuan
Class of 1994: Tao Hong, Gong Beibi, Duan Yihong
Class of 1995: Xia Yu
Class of 1996: Zhang Ziyi, Liu Ye, Qin Hailu, Mei Ting, Yuan Quan, Qin Hao
Class of 1997: Chen Hao, Calvin Li
Class of 1998: Deng Chao, Zhu Yuchen
Class of 1999: Chen Sicheng, Zhang Luyi
Class of 2000: Zhou Yun, Liu Yun, Gao Lu
Class of 2001: Zhang Xinyi
Class of 2002: Wen Zhang, Tiffany Tang, Tong Yao, Bai Baihe, Cao Xiwen, Bai Jing, Yang Shuo, Zhang Mo
Class of 2003: Wang Kai, Hans Zhang
Class of 2004: Tong Liya, Wang Zhi, Hu Sang, Zheng Qingwen
Class of 2005: Chen Xiao, Mao Xiaotong, Lin Xiawei, Lin Peng, Ying Er, Zhang Jianing
Class of 2006: Liu Yuxin, Song Yi
Class of 2007: Wei Daxun, Cheng Yi
Class of 2008: Ma Ke, Lan Yingying, Gao Weiguang
Class of 2009: Bai Yu
Class of 2010: Yang Yang, Qiao Xin, Liu Xueyi, Qin Junjie, Zhao Yingzi
Class of 2012: Yang Xuwen, Liang Jie
Class of 2013: Qu Chuxiao, Zhang Ming'en
Class of 2014: Dong Zijian, Chen Xingxu
Class of 2015: Liu Haoran, Dong Sicheng, Liang Sen
Class of 2016: Zhang Xueying, Zhao Jiamin
Class of 2018: Jackson Yee, Hu Xianxu , Li Landi , Luo Yizhou
Class of 2019: Jiang Yiyi, Li Faner
Class of 2020: Zhao Jinmai
Class of 2021: Wen Qi, Deng Zeming
Class of 2022: Ma Jiaqi, Song Yaxuan, 

Directing Department: Bao Guo'an (Class of 1977), Li Baotian (Class of 1979), Zhang Yang (Class of 1988), Zhang Jingchu (Class of 1997), Lin Yongjian (Class of 1999), Tang Wei (Class of 2000), Papi Jiang (Class of 2005)

Department of Musical Theatre: Sun Honglei (Class of 1995), Jin Dong (Class of 1999), Zhang Xincheng (Class of 2014)

Department of Stage Design: Zhang Lei (Class of 1995)

Department of Dramatic Literature: Zhang Yibai (Class of 1986), Diao Yinan (Class of 1987), Cai Shangjun (Class of 1988), Yilin Zhong (Class of 1993)

References

External links
  Central Academy of Drama official site (or https://web.archive.org/web/20070125013704/http://218.249.21.170/ when connection problems)
 http://www.chntheatre.edu.cn/

 
Universities and colleges in Beijing
Film schools in China
Drama schools in China
Educational institutions established in 1950
1950 establishments in China
Dongcheng District, Beijing
Schools in Dongcheng District, Beijing
Schools of Chinese opera